Shaun Reece Tuton (born 3 December 1991) is an English professional footballer who plays as a forward for Whitby Town.

Playing career

Early career
Tuton played lower league football for Teversal, Matlock Town, Belper Town, and Buxton. He trials at Carlisle United in January 2015 and Morecambe in February 2015. He was signed by FC Halifax Town manager Neil Aspin in August 2015. His performances for the "Shaymen" earned him comparison with Jamie Vardy, a striker who played for Halifax before working his way up into the Premier League.

Barnsley
Tuton was signed by League One side Barnsley in February 2016, getting his chance in the English Football League at the age of 24; Barnsley paid Halifax an undisclosed fee. He made seven appearances for Paul Heckingbottom's "Tykes" in the second half of the 2015–16 season, however failed to break into the first-team picture following the club's promotion into the Championship.

On 31 August 2016, he joined League Two club Grimsby Town on loan until the end of the 2016–17 season.

On 2 February 2017, he joined National League side Barrow on a 93-day loan. However his loan spell at the "Bluebirds" was ended by an ankle injury he picked up during a 2–1 defeat at Maidstone United on 1 April.

He had a trial at Scottish Premiership club Motherwell in July 2017, but "Steelmen" manager Stephen Robinson concluded that "[he] did well as a trialist but I didn't feel he was better than what we had". He joined Port Vale on trial in December 2017, who were managed by former Halifax boss Neil Aspin.

Non-League
On 20 January 2018, Tuton rejoined FC Halifax Town, this time on a loan deal for the rest of the season. He joined Chester in August 2018. After playing the first few games of the season for Chester he moved to Spennymoor Town.

On 2 October 2021, Tuton signed for Guiseley. In December 2021, Tuton suffered a broken leg that ruled him out of action for five months before re-signing for the 2022–23 season. In September 2022, Tuton returned for a third spell with Matlock Town in his career. Just one month after returning to Matlock Town however, Tuton transferred to another of his former clubs in Belper Town. In February 2023, he joined Whitby Town.

Statistics

References

External links

1991 births
Living people
Footballers from Sheffield
English footballers
Association football forwards
Teversal F.C. players
Matlock Town F.C. players
Belper Town F.C. players
Buxton F.C. players
FC Halifax Town players
Barnsley F.C. players
Grimsby Town F.C. players
Barrow A.F.C. players
Chester F.C. players
Spennymoor Town F.C. players
Chorley F.C. players
Boston United F.C. players
Alfreton Town F.C. players
Guiseley A.F.C. players
Whitby Town F.C. players
Northern Counties East Football League players
Northern Premier League players
National League (English football) players
English Football League players